Unbelievable may refer to:

Film and television
 Unbelievable!!!!!, a 2016 American film
 Unbelievable (miniseries), a 2019 American drama miniseries
 Unbelievable (TV series), a Japanese variety/documentary TV show
 The Unbelievable, a Hong Kong TV program about the paranormal and supernatural
 Lawrence Leung's Unbelievable, an Australian TV program about the paranormal and supernatural

Literature 
 Unbelievable (memoir), a 2017 memoir by Katy Tur
 Unbelievable (novel), a 2008 Pretty Little Liars novel by Sara Shepard
 Unbelievable (short story collection), a 1987 short-story collection by Paul Jennings
 Unbelievable, a 2009 book by Stacy Horn

Music

Albums 
 Unbelievable (Diamond Rio album) or the title song (see below), 1998
 Unbelievable (Keke Wyatt album) or the title song, 2011
 Unbelievable (Sarah Connor album), 2002
 Unbelievable (Wang Leehom album), 2003
 Unbelievable, by Kym, 2006
 Unbelievable, an EP by Lisa Ajax, or the title song (see below), 2014

Songs 
 "Unbelievable" (Bob Dylan song), 1990
 "Unbelievable" (Craig David song), 2006
 "Unbelievable" (Diamond Rio song), 1998
 "Unbelievable" (EMF song), 1990
 "Unbelievable" (Lisa Ajax song), 2014
 "Unbelievable" (The Notorious B.I.G. song), 1994
 "Unbelievable", by 24kGoldn, 2020
 "Unbelievable", by Kaci Brown from Instigator, 2005
 "Unbelievable", by Mark Medlock and Dieter Bohlen, 2007
 "Unbelievable", by Nat King Cole from  Ballads of the Day, 1956
 "Unbelievable", by Owl City and Hanson from Mobile Orchestra, 2015
 "Unbelievable", by Why Don't We, 2019
 "Unbelievable", by Woo Jin-young, 2022
 "Unbelievable (Ann Marie)", by Josh Gracin from We Weren't Crazy, 2008

See also

 Mr. Unbelievable, a 2015 Singaporean film
 The Unbelievable Truth (disambiguation)
 Believe (disambiguation)